Patearoa is a small settlement in inland Otago in New Zealand's South Island. Andrew Buchanan was an early runholder in Patearoa.

References

Populated places in Otago